Inflow may refer to:

 Inflow (hydrology), the water entering a body of water
 Inflow (meteorology), the influx of warmth and moisture from air into storm systems
 Capital inflows, in macroeconomics and international finance
 Infiltration/Inflow, in sanitary sewers

See also

 Outflow (disambiguation)